Neves-Corvo mine is a zinc-copper mine 15 km southeast of  Castro Verde, Portugal and 220 km southeast of Lisbon, in the district of Beja (Baixo Alentejo). It has a dedicated rail link to the port of Setúbal. The mine is principally accessed by shaft mining and a ramp from surface.  It is a main producer of copper and zinc mineral.

History
The deposit was found in 1977 following the discovery of a gravimetric anomaly part of the geophysical study of the Iberian Pyrite Belt, south Portugal.

The exploration of the ore deposits began in 1988 by Somincor.

In June 2004, Somincor, which owns the mine, was acquired by EuroZinc from Empresa de Desenvolvimento Mineiro and Rio Tinto.

In October 2006, EuroZinc was acquired by Lundin Mining.

In May 2017, Lundin Mining announced an expansion project for the mine.

References

Iberian Pyritic Belt
Buildings and structures in Beja District
Zinc mines in Portugal
Copper mines in Portugal